Merrimon is an unincorporated community in Carteret County, North Carolina, United States, approximately  away from Beaufort.  It is home to the Jonaquins Landing and Sand Hills housing developments. The only access to the Merrimon area is via Merrimon Road.

Unincorporated communities in Carteret County, North Carolina
Unincorporated communities in North Carolina
Populated coastal places in North Carolina